A total of 346 athletes will compete in the cycling competitions at the 2015 European Games; 223 in road cycling, 75 in mountain biking and 48 in BMX. All quota places are based on the UCI Nations Rankings at 31 December 2014.

The quota places were presented by UEC.

Summary

Legend
RR – Road Race
TT – Individual Time Trial
Q – Quotas
R – Riders

Road cycling

Men's road race

Women's road race

Men's time trial

Women's time trial

Mountain biking

Men's cross country

Women's cross country

BMX

Men

Women

References

Qualification
Qualification for the 2015 European Games